Love Factor is a 2014 Marathi romantic feature film written and directed by Kishor Vibhandik and produced by Mukund Satav. It stars  Rajesh Shringarpure, Khushboo Tawde and  Kushal Badrike.

Cast 
 Rajesh Shringarpure 
 Khushboo Tawde
 Kushal Badrike
 Harshada Bhawsar

Soundtrack

References

2010s Marathi-language films